Jules Maes (born 1882) was a Belgian fencer. He competed in the individual sabre competition at the 1924 Summer Olympics.

References

External links
 

1882 births
Year of death missing
Belgian male fencers
Belgian sabre fencers
Olympic fencers of Belgium
Fencers at the 1924 Summer Olympics